International Day for the Preservation of the Ozone Layer (informally and simply called Ozone Day) is celebrated on September 16 designed by the United Nations General Assembly.  This designation had been made on December 19, 2000, in commemoration of the date, in 1987, on which nations signed the Montreal Protocol on Substances that Deplete the Ozone Layer. In 1994, the UN General Assembly proclaimed 16 September the International Day for the Preservation of the Ozone Layer, commemorating the date of the signing, in 1987, of the Montreal Protocol on Substances that Deplete the Ozone Layer. The closure of the hole in the ozone layer was observed 30 years after the protocol was signed.  Due to the nature of the gases responsible for ozone depletion their chemical effects are expected to continue for between 50 and 100 years.

See also 

List of environmental dates
Scientific Assessment of Ozone Depletion

References

External links 
UN - International Day for the Preservation of the Ozone Layer
September 16 is International Ozone Day (sic)

Ozone
United Nations days
September observances
Recurring events established in 1994
Ozone depletion